Lágheiði is a heath between Ólafsfjörður and Fljót. 
Through the centuries this has been the route between this two settlements. 
Road was built over the heath in 1945 and it was the first driving connection with Ólafsfjörður. Due to heavy snows in the winter the road was generally closed from September to May.
One folktale is known from the heath - Dýrhóll .

Geography of Iceland